Yi County or Yixian is a county in west-central Liaoning Province, China, and is under the administration of the prefecture-level city of Jinzhou. Fengguo Temple, dating from 1020, is located in the county seat.

Administrative divisions
There are seven towns, one township, and 10 ethnic townships in the county.

Towns:
Yizhou, Qilihe, Jiudaoling, Dayushubao, Liulongtai, Gaotaizi, Shaohuyingzi

Townships:
Baimiaozi Township, Toutai Manchu Ethnic Township, Zhangjiabao Township, Qianyang Township, Dadingbao Manchu Ethnic Township, Waziyu Manchu Ethnic Township, Toudaohe Manchu Ethnic Township, Dicangsi Manchu Ethnic Township, Chengguan Manchu Ethnic Township, Liulonggou Manchu Ethnic Township, Juliangtun Manchu Ethnic Township

Climate

See also
 Yixian Formation

References

External links

County-level divisions of Liaoning
Jinzhou